All India Institute of Medical Sciences, Mangalagiri (AIIMS Mangalagiri or AIIMS-MG)  is a medical research public higher education institute located in the Mangalagiri Tadepalle Municipal Corporation in Guntur district, Andhra Pradesh, India. It is one of the four "Phase-IV" All India Institutes of Medical Sciences (AIIMS) announced in July 2014. It is located between Guntur and Vijayawada.Foundation stone is laid by Union minister's J.P Nadda , M.Venkaiah Naidu & chief minister of Andhra Pradesh N. Chandrababu Naidu

History
Construction work on the permanent campus started in September 2017.

Academics 
Meanwhile, AIIMS Manglagiri has commenced the academic session 2018-19 from temporary campus at Siddhartha Medical College with 50 students. In the academic year 2019-20, 50 more students joined the institute. The first batch in the permanent campus is 2020-21 batch with 125 students. The outpatient department at the permanent campus started operating in March 2019.The inpatient department started in January, 2021.

See also
 Education in Guntur
 Education in India
 List of medical colleges in India

References

External links 
 

Colleges in Guntur
Mangalagiri
Medical colleges in Andhra Pradesh
Educational institutions established in 2018
2018 establishments in Andhra Pradesh